Russia competed at the 2002 Winter Olympics in Salt Lake City.

Medalists

Alpine skiing 

Men

Women

Biathlon 

Men

Women

Bobsleigh

Cross-country skiing 

Distance

Men

Women

Sprint

Curling

Women's
Team: Olga Zharkova (skip), Nkeirouka Ezekh, Yana Nekrasova, Anastassia Skoultan.
Round Robin

Draw 1
;Draw 2
;Draw 3
;Draw 5
;Draw 6
;Draw 7
;Draw 8
;Draw 10
;Draw 12
;

Figure skating

Freestyle skiing 

Men

Women

Ice hockey

Men

Preliminary round

Play-off
Quarterfinal

Semifinal

Bronze game

Women

Preliminary round

Play-off
Classification 5/8 places

Classification 5/6 places

Luge

Nordic combined

Short track speed skating 

Women

Skeleton

Ski jumping

Snowboarding 

Parallel GS

Speed skating 

Men

Women

References

External links
Official Olympic Reports
International Olympic Committee results database

Nations at the 2002 Winter Olympics
2002
Winter Olympics